The Ecologist Green Party, formerly known as the Ecologist Party of Moldova "Green Alliance" (PEMAV) is a green political party in Moldova.

History
The party was established on April 9, 1992. The Founding Congress adopted the program and bylaws and elected the governing bodies. Gheorghe Malarciuc was the first leader of the party.

Ideology
The party presents itself as a free political party created by Moldovan citizens, advocating sustainable development, inter-ethnic cohesion, democracy, environmental preservation and respect for human rights, using the naturalistic and cultural models. the policies of the green parties that have succeeded. It defends the principle of social equity and equal opportunities for all. It also promotes the formation of a society with a strong, free economy, with a social and ecological orientation.

The measures envisaged by the party are:

Economy : 

- Reorientation of economic and trade policies to serve social and environmental objectives, not just economic indices.

- Make political and decision-making processes more democratic, inclusive, transparent and fully accessible to ordinary citizens, locally and nationally.

- Opposition to the military blocs and all the militarization, as well as to the presence of foreign forces on the territory of the republic.

- Supports the unconditional withdrawal of Russian military troops from the territory of the Republic of Moldova and the liquidation of ammunition arsenals in Covbasna.

- Greater state support to support any economic activity aimed at producing goods and providing services to the population by reducing the number of taxes.

- Minimize State intervention in economic activities

Agriculture :

- Reforming agriculture by supporting organic farming

- Revival of industries thanks to the wide use of renewable energy sources

- Monitoring and reducing bureaucracy throughout the economy

- Production of long-term, easy-to-use industrial landfills

- Ensure wise use of energy and raw materials

- Reuse of natural products and their recycling

- Exclusion of the production chain of products and processes leading to the deregulation of the ecological balance, endangering the health and life of people

- Recycling of waste and used products

- Development and improvement of environmental legislation and judicious management of natural resources based on the rigorous ecological expertise of all projects developed

- Promote territorial administrative reform by returning to large geographic territorial areas that encompass natural ecosystems and can generate maximum economic and social returns

- Decentralization of power and strengthening of local public administration

- Promote the social and solidarity economy

- Favor the "polluter pays"

- Promote the harmonization of environmental legislation with European legislation, acting in the direction of the moral recovery of society by introducing the concept of Eco-morality

- Competent national review on the use of electricity

- Development of new energy conservation technologies

- Promote technologies for the recycling and reuse of industrial waste, raw materials, the implementation of efficient technologies to obtain renewable energies

- Implementation of decentralized forms, supporting small power generation units, in particular biogas, pyrolysis, small hydropower plants, biomass and wind energy

- Raise the standard of living of the rural population

- Improve the quality of agri-food products by developing new technologies that exclude the excessive use of synthetic products and other pollutants

- Establishment of new scientific and natural reserves specific to all regions of Moldova

- Protection of forests and biodiversity

- Fight against poaching

Territorial policies :

- Development of cities with respect for the environment

- Encourage cycling as a means of locomotion, by adapting the arteries of the road to cycling

- Widening of sidewalks and organization of pedestrian underpasses at street intersections

- Reduce noise by using quiet motors, reducing traffic at night, using noise-canceling windows, reducing city traffic and limiting speed.

Democratic's laws :

- Respect for the principles of the Universal Declaration of Human Rights

Children's rights:

- Strengthen the responsibility of parents and educators for the growth and education of new generations

- Helping large families

- Improve the conditions of education and training in pre-university and university institutions, which will increase the level of culture of new generations

- Increase the professional level of teaching staff in the process of educating children and young people

- Feeding children in public institutions with native natural foods

- Give attention to the use of leisure time by young people

- Careful attitude toward the elderly and the disabled.

Culture :

- Adopt a comprehensive program of familiarization of the population with the achievements of universal and national culture at all stages of human evolution

- Stimulate all actions to revive the national and patriotic conscience

- Strengthening the activity of cultural institutions and NGOs aimed at increasing the civilization of society

Education:

- Educate society in a spirit of respect for the environment and good management of natural resources

- To increase man's responsibility towards nature by introducing him to the new concept of life, with emphasis on increasing the degree of ecological culture

- Participation of teachers, parents and children in the management of the school

- Supporting secondary education in two years and an independent education system

- Permanent diversification of all options at all stages of education, as well as the establishment and development of a vocational training system at all levels

- Support material in the form of scholarships and tuition fees and to encourage private initiatives

- Stimulate the social and political activity of students and students, paying particular attention to the growth of general culture and the protection of the environment

- To promote active engagement in the process of economic and social transformation, building a green and ecological state and opting for the establishment of a green emblem among the ranks of youth, encompassing ecological activities

Health:

- Free and universal health insurance system,

- Abolition of the bureaucracy of the national health service and make health services more efficient

- Development of the private health insurance system, motivating and stimulating work aimed at improving the health of the population

- Elimination of the causes of environmental pollution by abandoning inadequate technologies producing products harmful to human health and the environment

- Competent food quality analysis to identify quantities of nitrates and other harmful substances

- Ensure the quality of dietary products and foods for children by reducing the content of chemical ingredients

- Increase the responsibility of man for his own health, with emphasis on the role of physical education of the population of all ages

- The opening of small hospitals in urban and rural areas near the house. Increased use of popular methods of treating patients and concomitant reduction in the administration of drugs based on chemical compounds

- Improve statistics on the state of health of the population.

Internal and external policies :

- Favorable to a foreign policy of cooperation with all peace-loving countries in the world, guaranteeing a policy of good understanding with all the neighbors and of regional and world security

- Recognize the rights set out in the Universal Declaration of Human Rights

- Creation of equal conditions for the activity of all parties, social-political and public organizations, religious associations, creation, etc.

- Unlimited access to justice for all citizens

- Establishment of a committed and competent legal system, which also provides for evaluation of the quality of the act of justice

- Ensure effective administration of justice, by working on strong measures to eliminate crime and corruption.

Electoral results

See also 
Green party
Green politics
List of environmental organizations

References

External links
Official website
European Greens profile for the Ecologist Party "Green Alliance" of Moldova

1992 establishments in Moldova
European Green Party
Global Greens member parties
Green parties in Europe
Political parties established in 1992
Political parties in Moldova